Attack on Titan is a Japanese manga series written and illustrated by Hajime Isayama. The story is set in a world where humanity lives inside cities surrounded by enormous walls due to the Titans, gigantic humanoid creatures who devour humans seemingly without reason. The story centers around Eren Yeager, alongside his childhood friends, Mikasa Ackerman and Armin Arlert, whose lives are changed forever after the appearance of a Colossus Titan brings about the destruction of their home town and the death of Eren's mother. Vowing revenge and to reclaim the world from the Titans, Eren, Mikasa and Armin join the Survey Corps, an elite group of soldiers who fight Titans outside the walls.

The series began serialization in Kodansha's monthly publication Bessatsu Shōnen Magazine in its October 2009 issue and ended in its May 2021 issue. The first tankōbon volume was released in March 2010, and the 34th and final volume was released in June 2021. In North America, the series is published in English by Kodansha USA, that first published the first volume on June 19, 2012, with a three or four-month interval between each release until mid-2013, when subsequent volumes started being released on a monthly basis to catch up faster with the original Japanese releases, which they did at the end of that year, subsequently returning to the previous schedule. The series has also been adapted into an anime television series by IG Port's Wit Studio (seasons 1 to 3) and MAPPA (season 4), with the first episode airing on April 7, 2013, on MBS. The anime is also being streamed by both Funimation and Crunchyroll on their respective websites.

Manga

Attack on Titan
Chapters in the Kodansha USA publications are numbered as episodes.

Junior High

 is a parody manga written and illustrated by Saki Nakagawa, serialized in Bessatsu Shōnen Magazine since its May 2012 issue. The first tankōbon volume was released April 9, 2013, and the eleventh and last was released on August 9, 2016. In North America, the series has been licensed in English by Kodansha USA, who published the first volume on March 11, 2014 and the fifth and last on July 31, 2018.

Before the Fall

 is a spinoff manga illustrated by Satoshi Shiki, based on the prequel light novel series of the same name written by Ryō Suzukaze. The series has been serialized in Monthly Shōnen Sirius from August 26, 2013 to March 26, 2019, and was collected in seventeen volumes. The first tankōbon volume was released on December 9, 2013 and the last on April 9, 2019. In North America, the series has been licensed in English by Kodansha USA, who published the first volume on March 11, 2014.

No Regrets

 is a spinoff manga written by Gun Snark and illustrated by Hikaru Suruga, serialized in the Aria magazine from its start in the November 28, 2013 issue to June 28, 2014.  The manga is an adaptation of the visual novel of the same name. It focuses on the origin story of Levi, before he was a part of the Survey Corps Special Operations Squad. In North America, the series has been licensed in English by Kodansha USA, which released both volumes in 2014.

Spoof on Titan

 is a comedic yonkoma manga written and illustrated by Hounori, released on Kodansha's Manga Box smartphone and tablet application from December 2013 to December 30, 2014, in both Japanese and English. The first tankōbon volume was published on August 8, 2014, and the second on April 9, 2015.

Lost Girls

A manga adaptation by Ryōsuke Fuji of the light novel of the same name, that began serialization in Kodansha's magazine Bessatsu Shōnen Magazine on August 9, 2015.  The series ended in the June 2016 issue of the magazine on May 9, 2016. In North America, the series has been licensed in English by Kodansha USA, which released the volumes in 2016 and 2017.

Novels

Before the Fall

 is a light novel written by Ryō Suzukaze and illustrated by Thores Shibamoto. It initially follows the story of Angel, the blacksmith who develops the first prototypes of the Vertical Maneuvering Equipment, before focusing on a young man who was found as a baby in the stomach of a Titan. Three volumes of Before the Fall were published between December 2, 2011, and June 29, 2012. Vertical licensed the light novels in October 2013 for distribution in English.

Harsh Mistress of the City

 is written by Ryō Kawakami and illustrated by Range Murata. It depicts the aftermath of the fall of Wall Maria first shown at the beginning of the manga. The first volume was published on August 1, 2014 and the second and last on May 1, 2015. Vertical released both volumes in English in 2015.

Lost Girls

 is written by Hiroshi Seko.  It comprises three short stories featuring Mikasa Ackerman and Annie Leonhart, titled "Lost in the cruel world", "Wall Sina, Goodbye". It was published in Japan on December 9, 2014, and in North America on June 28, 2016, by Vertical.

Garrison Girl
Garrison Girl: An Attack on Titan Novel was written by American author Rachel Aaron and published by Quirk Books on August 7, 2018. It is centered on Rosalie Dumarque, who defies her family to join the military garrison.

Notes

References

External links
  
  at Kodansha Comics
 Attack on Titan at The Encyclopedia of Science Fiction
 

Lists of manga volumes and chapters
Chapters